Red Front may refer to:

Rotfrontkämpferbund (Red Front Fighters' League), a paramilitary organization associated with KPD
Red Front (UK), a socialist electoral coalition which stood candidates in the 1987 UK general election

Nissan 350Z palind Red Front a 2006 model of Nissan auto 
Red Front of Tamil Eelamists, one of Sri Lankan Tamil militant groups
Revolutionary Communist alliance - Red Front, a splinter offshoot of the Socialist Organization in Israel (Matzpen), an organization which had several of its members (the most famous of which are Daud Turki and Ehud Adiv) arrested on grounds of treason.

See also Rot Front (disambiguation)